Byron Burneil "Bones" Walker (born July 28, 1960) is a former American professional football player who was a wide receiver for the Seattle Seahawks of the National Football League.  A free agent signee he was a member of the team from 1982 to 1986 making 54 receptions for 925 yards and 7 touchdowns. A native of Warner Robins, Georgia he lettered 4 years at The Citadel where his career marks of 101 receptions for 1486 yards and 9 touchdowns still rank him in the top 5 in all 3 categories.

References 

The Citadel Bulldogs football players
Seattle Seahawks players
1960 births
Living people